James Thomas Heathershaw  (7 May 187125 July 1943) was an Australian public servant and the third Secretary of the Department of the Treasury.

Early life
Heathershaw was born on 7 May 1871 in Beaufort, Victoria. He was the twelfth child of Henry and Amelia Nancy (née Robilliard), and attended Flinders School in Geelong.

Career
Heathershaw joined the Victorian Public Service in March 1889, transferring to the newly-formed Federal Treasury in 1902. In 1926, Heathershaw was appointed Secretary of the Treasury, becoming Australia's third Treasurer. He stood down from the role in 1932 due to poor health and went back to being Assistant Secretary in charge of pensions, compensation and insurance, before officially retiring in December 1935; he had even delayed his retirement date by some nine months to finish reorganising the Treasury's pensions department.

Personal life and death
Heathershaw married Rosa Ethel Rodway at the Primitive Methodist Church in Carlton, on 7 March 1901; they had a son and a daughter. James Heathershaw spent his final years in Elwood, Melbourne, where he enjoyed golfing and gardening. He died on 25 July 1943, aged 72, at Oakleigh railway station. The cause of death was reportedly cardiovascular disease.

Awards
In June 1927 Heathershaw was created a Commander of the Order of the British Empire, while Secretary to the Treasury.

References

1871 births
1943 deaths
Australian Commanders of the Order of the British Empire
Secretaries of the Department of the Treasury of Australia
Public servants from Melbourne